The 1925–26 Football League season was Birmingham Football Club's 30th in the Football League and their 13th in the First Division. They finished in 14th position in the 22-team division. They also competed in the 1925–26 FA Cup, entering at the third round proper and losing to South Shields in the fourth.

Twenty players made at least one appearance in nationally organised first-team competition, and there were ten different goalscorers. Goalkeeper Dan Tremelling played in 43 of the 44 matches over the season; among outfield players, full-back Jack Jones and forward Johnny Crosbie played one fewer, and half-back George Liddell and forward Wally Harris each appeared in 41. Joe Bradford was leading scorer for the fifth successive year, with 27 goals, of which 26 were scored in the league.

Football League First Division

League table (part)

FA Cup

Appearances and goals

See also
Birmingham City F.C. seasons

References
General
 Matthews, Tony (1995). Birmingham City: A Complete Record. Breedon Books (Derby). .
 Matthews, Tony (2010). Birmingham City: The Complete Record. DB Publishing (Derby). .
 Source for match dates and results: "Birmingham City 1925–1926: Results". Statto Organisation. Retrieved 12 May 2012.
 Source for lineups, appearances, goalscorers and attendances: Matthews (2010), Complete Record, pp. 292–93.

Specific

Birmingham City F.C. seasons
Birmingham